Andrew Michael Duncan Lycett (born 1948) FRSL is an English biographer and journalist.

Early life
Born at Stamford, Lincolnshire to Peter Norman Lycett Lycett and Joan Mary Duncan (née Day), Lycett spent some of his childhood in Tanganyika, where his father established a preparatory school, The Southern Highlands School. Peter Lycett's mother was of the Burns-Lindow family of Ingwell and Ehen Hall, Cumbria. Lycett was educated at Charterhouse School and studied history at Christ Church, Oxford.

Career
Lycett worked for a while for The Times as a correspondent in Africa, the Middle East, and Asia. He has written several well-received biographies and he is best known for his biography of Ian Fleming, Ian Fleming: The Man Behind James Bond.

He was elected a Fellow of the Royal Society of Literature in 2009 and he is a Fellow in 2014.

He lives and writes in London.

Bibliography

Books
 
 
 Ian Fleming (W&N, 1995); US title, Ian Fleming: The man behind James Bond (Turner Publishing, 1995) 
 From Diamond Sculls to Golden Handcuffs: A history of Rowe & Pitman (London: Robert Hale, 1999) – stockbrokers established by George Duncan Rowe and Frederick I. Pitman
 Rudyard Kipling (W&N, 1999)
 Barrack-Room Ballads, Rudyard Kipling (2001?) – an edition of Barrack-Room Ballads and other verses (1892) annotated by Lycett
 Dylan Thomas: A new life (W&N, 2003) 
 Conan Doyle: The man who created Sherlock Holmes (W&N, 2007); US title, The Man Who Created Sherlock Holmes: The life and times of Sir Arthur Conan Doyle (Free Press, 2007)
 Kipling Abroad: Traffics and discoveries from Burma to Brazil, Rudyard Kipling, edited by Lycett (I.B. Tauris, 2010)
 Wilkie Collins: A life of sensation (Hutchinson & Co., 2013)

Book reviews

References

External links
 

Living people
1948 births
English biographers
Fellows of the Royal Society of Literature
History Today people
People educated at Charterhouse School